Quarterlife (stylized as quarterlife) is an American web series, also briefly an NBC television series in 2008, created by Marshall Herskovitz and Edward Zwick, the creators of Thirtysomething and Once and Again, and producers of My So-Called Life.  The show is about a group of twenty-something artists who are coming of age in the digital generation.

Following the dismal reception of the premiere episode of the NBC television show as it coincided with a televised democratic primary debate with President Obama and Hillary Clinton, the other five episodes were aired in a marathon on NBC Universal sibling channel Bravo on March 9, making Quarterlife one of the few television shows to be canceled after one episode.

The regular cast included Bitsie Tulloch, Kevin Christy, Mike Faiola, Scott Michael Foster, Michelle Lombardo, Maïté Schwartz, and David Walton.

Characters

Main characters
Dylan Krieger (Bitsie Tulloch) is a self-proclaimed writer who works as an associate editor at a magazine called Attitude. She keeps a video blog on the social networking website Quarterlife.
Debra Locatelli (Michelle Lombardo) is Dylan's best friend and roommate. She works in her father's appliance store. Debra has anxiety problems.
Lisa Herford (Maïté Schwartz) shares the apartment with Dylan and Debra. She is in acting school and works as a bartender. Lisa also reluctantly becomes a singer for a band despite her low self-confidence.
Jed Berland (Scott Michael Foster) is next-door neighbor to the girls and a film maker fresh out of film school.
Danny Franklin (David Walton) is Jed's business partner and roommate. He is also Debra's ex-boyfriend; Danny and Debra broke up after he cheated on her.
Andy Melman (Kevin Christy) is Jed and Danny's 'sidekick', assisting them in the production of their videos.
Eric Greensohn (Mike Faiola) is an old friend of Debra's who comes to visit her and then stays to pursue a relationship with Dylan. Eric is an environmental activist.

Other characters
Vanessa (Majandra Delfino)  is a free-spirited girl who dates Jed, Andy, and Danny.
John (O. T. Fagbenle) is a musician who asks Lisa to join his band, and also dates her.
Brittany (Barret Swatek) is Dylan's boss who has some unresolved feelings towards Dylan.
Carly (Bree Turner) is a car saleswoman with whom Danny has an affair.
Josh (Mark Matkevich) is a bartender and co-worker of Lisa.
Mindy Krieger (Lolita Davidovich) is Dylan's mother.

Television

NBC announced on November 17, 2007 that the network had acquired the rights to air Quarterlife on broadcast television in early 2008, after the episodes have been broadcast on the Internet. In February 2008, NBC announced that Quarterlife would premiere on Tuesday, February 26, 2008, with the show moving to Sunday nights immediately afterwards. The show's first episode earned 3.1 million viewers, falling behind shows on ABC, CBS, and MSNBC in the same time slot and ultimately ranking 17th for the night. After the first episode failed to earn the ratings the network had hoped, NBC announced that the series would be canceled after airing only one episode. Its remaining episodes would air on sibling channel Bravo following the NBC cancellation.

The show's 3.1 million viewer rating was the worst in-season performance in the 10 p.m. hour by an NBC show in at least 17 years. While expected to be successful with teenagers due to its MySpace origins, Quarterlife lost to Bad Girls Club on Oxygen in the teen demographic and tied with the Democratic Presidential debate airing at the same time on sibling channel MSNBC. The show also performed poorly in the adults 18-49 demographic, where it managed only a 1.6 rating.

The series aired on the then-existing E! television system in Canada in simulcast.

Episodes
The first season was released online in 36 parts, each approximately eight minutes, from November 2007 to March 2008.  Each eight-minute episode of the series premiered nearly simultaneously on MySpace and the official Quarterlife site. It garnered the third-highest views of any scripted series in Myspace history. These were combined into six hour-long episodes for television.

In five months, total online views for the series—on Myspace, Quarterlife, and YouTube—were over 9 million. After the series was picked up by NBC, some of the hour-long episodes (as edited for broadcast) were made available on the NBC and Hulu websites. During this time, Herskowitz claimed the show accrued an average of 300k views per episode. After cancelation by NBC Episodes 2-6 were broadcast back-to-back on Bravo on March 9, 2008.

Television episodes

Online episodes

Video blogs
Characters in the Series post video blogs on quarterlife.com, Myspace, and YouTube.

References

External links
Official Site. Archived from the original on February 10, 2008.
Quarterlife on MySpace. Archived from the original on January 23, 2008.
Quarterlife on NBC. Archived from the original on February 18, 2008.

Art Film Talk #23 Marshall Herskovitz – Interview with the co-creator of the show, November 30, 2007 (audio).

American comedy web series
Television series canceled after one episode
2007 web series debuts